The Taichung City Tun District Art Center (TTDAC) is an art center in Taiping District, Taichung, Taiwan as a primary venue for performing arts, music, fine arts and cultural promotion. It is the subordinate institute to Taichung City Cultural Affairs Bureau.

History
The area of the building was originally used as a military practice field and was provided by the military for the Taichung County Government for free.

Architecture
The concept behind the art center is the combination of harmony with moderation and simplicity to create an intelligent building. The circular arch in the building line a musical rhythm gives the building a simplicity, nature, ecology and harmony kind of surrounding.

See also
 List of tourist attractions in Taiwan

References

External links
 

Art centers in Taichung